Aboudou is a surname. Notable people with the surname include:

Affandi Aboudou (born 2003), Seychellois footballer
Izaka Aboudou (born 1994), Ghanaian footballer
Jordan Aboudou (born 1991), French basketball player, brother of Lens
Lens Aboudou (born 1990), French basketball player